The Muslim Institute is an intellectual organisation based in London, United Kingdom. Established in 1973, the organisation was re-launched in 2009 as a fellowship society and was modelled on "futawwah" clubs, groups that promoted a virtuous life based on knowledge, humility, magnanimity, hospitality, social work and the service of humanity during the Islamic Golden Age. The Institute promotes pluralism, innovation and creativity while also encouraging open debate and discussion on issues pertaining to Islam, Muslims and Muslim societies.

History 
The Muslim Institute was established in 1972 as a research body devoted to drawing up detailed conceptual maps and operational plans of a Muslim civilization of the future. The initiative was led by Kalim Siddiqui, a journalist who worked for The Guardian; Ziauddin Sardar, a writer, futurist and economist; and Iqbal Asaria. The Institute was established as a charitable trust under the title, "The Muslim Institute for Research and Planning", and Siddiqui became its director.

Motivation
The founders and their associates were concerned about the decline and decay of Muslim societies. They argued that past Islamic civilizations were based on knowledge, and they were keen to rebuild this foundation of knowledge and innovation. They emphasised the urgent need for an articulate and rationally satisfying tradition of Muslim scholarship and argued that Muslim intellectuals had the potential for "recreating fully operational social, economic and political systems of Islam in all Muslim societies".

Public education
Initially, the Muslim Institute organised seminars and courses on four main areas: the philosophy of science, Islamic Economics, the study of Islamic movements and foundations of Islamic civilisation. Later, it embarked on a project called The Road to Medina, a three-volume study on the contemporary relevance of the life of Muhammad. The project was funded by the Ministry of Higher Education in Saudi Arabia, but it was never completed. The Institute was more successful in producing new work on science and technology, which included Ziauddin Sardar's book Science, Technology and Development in the Muslim World. The funding from Saudi Arabia was used to purchase a building for the Institute at 6 Endsleigh Street in London, UK. The building served as the main office of the Institute for several years.

Iranian influence
In the wake of the 1979 Iranian Revolution, Siddiqui became a strong supporter of the regime in Iran. The Muslim Institute devoted all its resources to propagating the ideology of the Islamic Revolution and its Endsleigh Street office almost became an extension of the Iranian embassy. At this juncture, Ziauddin Sardar left the Institute.

Muslim parliament
In 1989, following the publication of Salman Rushdie's The Satanic Verses and the ensuing controversy, Siddiqui established the Muslim Parliament of Great Britain, which he described as "an independent representative political body for Muslims." The Muslim Institute also become closely associated with the Muslim Parliament.  The sudden death of Siddiqui in April 1996 ended the Muslim parliament and also concluded the Institute's relationship with Iran. The new director, academic and political activist, Ghyasuddin Siddiqui, initiated a series of monthly brainstorming sessions to rethink the work of the Institute and provide it with new directions. 

Under Siddiqui's guidance, the emphasis of the Institute shifted to issues of democracy, human rights, freedom of speech, pluralism, gender equality and empowering women. The Institute launched a number of initiatives, including campaigns for "Child Protection in Faith-Based Environments" and against forced marriage, domestic violence, and honour killing. A new "Model Muslim Marriage Contract," which grants equal rights to both partners, was also produced. The Institute subsequently played a role in the formation of the City Circle, British Muslims for Secular Democracy and The MUJU Crew (a Muslim–Jewish theatre group).

Re-launch
In December 2009, after a planning conference held at Sarum College, the Muslim Institute was re-launched as an independent fellowship society of academics, writers, thinkers, artists, scientists, professionals and researchers committed to the intellectual development of Muslims. The Trust was reorganised, and its office was moved to Old Street in London. Ziauddin Sardar returned as the Chair of the Muslim Institute Trust. and launched the Muslim Institute quarterly Critical Muslim.

Leadership 
Merryl Wyn Davies, director
 Samia Rahman, deputy director

Trustees include:
Ziauddin Sardar (chair)
Ghayasuddin Siddiqui

See also
Kalim Siddiqui
The Satanic Verses
British Muslims for Secular Democracy

References

External links 
 Muslim Institute website
 Ziauddin Sardar website
 Rules governing British Muslim Islamic marriages
 The Muslim Institute joint event at the Inclusive Mosque Initiative

Islamic organisations based in the United Kingdom